In botany, a sport or bud sport, traditionally called lusus, is a part of a plant that shows morphological differences from the rest of the plant. Sports may differ by foliage shape or color, flowers, fruit, or branch structure. The cause is generally thought to be a chance genetic mutation.

Sports with desirable characteristics are often propagated vegetatively to form new cultivars that retain the characteristics of the new morphology. Such selections are often prone to "reversion", meaning that part or all of the plant reverts to its original form. An example of a bud sport is the nectarine, at least some of which developed as a bud sport from peaches. Other common fruits resulting from a sport mutation are the red Anjou pear, the Ruby Red grapefruit, and the 'Pink Lemonade' lemon, which is a sport of the "Eureka" lemon.

See also
 Mosaic (genetics)

References

Plant morphology
Mutation
Horticulture